is a former Japanese football player and manager. He is the current manager of Fujieda MYFC.

Playing career 
Sudo was born in Yokohama on April 25, 1977. After graduating from Tokai University, he joined newly was promoted to J2 League club, Mito HollyHock in 2000. He became a regular player as forward from first season. In 2001, he played many matches and scored 10 goals. In 2002, he moved to J2 club Shonan Bellmare. He played many matches as substitute forward. In 2003, he moved to J2 club Ventforet Kofu. He played many matches and the club won the 3rd place in 2005 and was promoted to J1 League from 2006. At 2007 J.League Cup, he scored 6 goals and became a top scorer. In 2008, he moved to J1 club Vissel Kobe. However he could hardly play in the match for injuries in 2 seasons. In 2010, he moved to Regional Leagues club Fujieda MYFC. He retired end of 2010 season.

Coaching career
In June 2018, Sudo signed with J3 League club Gainare Tottori and became a manager. The club finished at the 3rd place in 2018 season and he resigned end of 2018 season.

In 12 July 2021, he was appointed as manager of Fujieda MYFC to replace Yasuharu Kurata who resigned 12 July 2021.on 20 November 2022, he led his club to promotion to the J2 League for the first time in history as it finished in the runners-up position. A day later, he won manager of the year in the 2022 season.

Club statistics

Managerial statistics
.

Honours

Manager
 Fujieda MYFC
 Promotion to J2 League 2023

 Individual
 J3 League Manager of the Year: 2022

References

External links
 
 

1977 births
Living people
Tokai University alumni
Association football people from Kanagawa Prefecture
Japanese footballers
J1 League players
J2 League players
Mito HollyHock players
Shonan Bellmare players
Ventforet Kofu players
Vissel Kobe players
Fujieda MYFC players
Association football forwards
Japanese football managers
J2 League managers
J3 League managers
Gainare Tottori managers
Fujieda MYFC managers